Judge Brennan may refer to:

Bridget M. Brennan (born 1974), judge of the United States District Court for the Northern District of Ohio
Michael B. Brennan (born 1963), judge of the United States Court of Appeals for the Seventh Circuit
Stephen W. Brennan (1893–1968), judge of the United States District Court for the Northern District of New York

See also
Justice Brennan (disambiguation)